BNS Ali Haider was a  Type 41 anti aircraft frigate of the Bangladesh Navy. She served in the Bangladesh Navy from 1978 to 2014. The ship was named after the fourth Rashidun Caliph Ali.

History
She was laid down by William Denny and Brothers on 2 November 1953 and launched on 20 July 1957. She was commissioned by the Royal Navy on 12 December 1959. She underwent a major refit in the mid-1960s that replaced her sensors and electronic warfare systems. On 6 July 1978, she was sold to the Bangladesh Navy.

Career
BNS Ali Haider was commissioned into the Bangladesh Navy fleet on 6 July 1978. She served under Commodore Commanding Bangladesh Navy Flotilla (COMBAN). After serving in the Bangladesh Navy for about 36 years and an overall total of 55 years of service, the ship was decommissioned on 22 January 2014. and scrapped. She was replaced by a Chinese-built Type 053H2 frigate  with the same name and pennant number.

See also
List of historic ships of the Bangladesh Navy

References

Decommissioned ships of the Bangladesh Navy
Leopard-class frigates of the Bangladesh Navy
Leopard-class frigates
Ships built on the River Clyde
1957 ships
Frigates of the Bangladesh Navy